Zeylevo (Yäyläw) is a rural locality (a village) in Uchpilinsky Selsoviet, Dyurtyulinsky District, Bashkortostan, Russia. The population was 176 as of 2010. There are 4 streets.

Geography 
Zeylevo is located 15 km southeast of Dyurtyuli (the district's administrative centre) by road. Uchpili is the nearest rural locality.

References 

Rural localities in Dyurtyulinsky District